The Blosyrini comprise a weevil tribe in the subfamily Entiminae.

Genera 
 Blosyrodes
 Blosyrosoma
 Blosyrus
 Bradybamon
 Dactylotus
 Holonychus
 Proscephaladeres

References 

 Lacordaire, T. 1863: Histoire Naturelle des Insectes. Genera des Coléoptères ou exposé méthodique et critique de tous les genres proposés jusqu'ici dans cet ordre d'insectes. Vol.: 6. Roret. Paris: 637 pp.

External links 

Entiminae
Polyphaga tribes